Apart from his hundreds of church cantatas, Johann Sebastian Bach wrote secular cantatas in Weimar, Köthen and Leipzig, for instance for members of the Royal-Polish and Prince-electoral Saxonian family (e.g. Trauer-Ode), or other public or private occasions (e.g. Hunting Cantata). The text of these cantatas was occasionally in dialect (e.g. Peasant Cantata) or in Italian (e.g. Amore traditore). Many of the secular cantatas were lost, but for some of these the text and the occasion are known, for instance when Picander later published their libretto (e.g. BWV Anh. 11–12). Some of the secular cantatas had a plot carried by mythological figures of Greek antiquity (e.g. Der Streit zwischen Phoebus und Pan), others were almost miniature buffo operas (e.g. Coffee Cantata).

Extant secular cantatas are published in the New Bach Edition (Neue Bach-Ausgabe, NBA), Series I, volumes 35 to 40, with the two Italian cantatas included in volume 41. The Bach Digital website lists 50 secular cantatas by Bach. Less than half of Bach's known secular cantatas survive with music. For most of the others at least the libretto survives. Some of the secular cantatas are based on music Bach had composed at an earlier date (e.g. some music of the first Brandenburg Concerto was adopted in a secular cantata), and Bach quite often parodied secular cantatas into church music: for instance his Christmas Oratorio opens with music originally written for a secular cantata.

In the Bach-Werke-Verzeichnis (BWV) the range of Nos. 201 to 216a contains mostly extant secular cantatas. Other secular cantatas are in the range of the church cantatas (BWV 1–200), most of them with an "a", "b" or "c" index added to the number of a church cantata while the cantatas share the same music. The same applies for the secular cantata precursors of the Easter Oratorio. Other secular cantatas are listed in BWV Anh. I, that is the appendix of the lost works. Even for these cantatas the music can sometimes be reconstructed, based on the church cantatas that were derived from them.

History
Bach's earliest cantatas are church cantatas, although his early Wedding Quodlibet is sometimes grouped with the secular cantatas. The oldest extant secular cantata is from his Weimar period where he composed the Hunting Cantata (BWV 208, first version) for the birthday of Christian, Duke of Saxe-Weissenfels on 23 February 1713. The libretto was written by Salomon Franck. A few years later, the cantata was performed again, in a modified version, for his employer Ernest Augustus I, Duke of Saxe-Weimar-Eisenach.

In his Köthen period, Bach wrote congratulatory cantatas for his new employer, Leopold, Prince of Anhalt-Köthen, usually on the Prince's birthday, or for New Year. BWV 66a, 134a, Anh. 6, Anh. 7, 184a, 173a and Anh. 8 are examples of such cantatas, the oldest of which were composed on a libretto by Christian Friedrich Hunold. Up to this point Bach's secular cantatas are generally in the Serenata format, lighthearted music with allegorical characters conversing about the excellence of the employer, and expressing their best wishes.

A secular wedding cantata, BWV 202, an Italian cantata (BWV 203), and the secular model for the Störmthal cantata BWV 194 probably originated around the same period. Bach's earliest known secular cantata on a libretto by Picander dates from 1725. Bach wrote or re-staged at least 36 secular cantatas in the last 25 years of his life, and around half of these were on librettos by Picander.

Occasions for Bach's secular cantatas written in Leipzig included Birthdays and name days for successive prince-electors of Saxony and other rulers, and their relatives, of principalities and duchies in Saxony, and similar occasions for academics of the university of Leipzig. Bach wrote sacred cantatas for funerals and weddings: he also wrote a few secular works for such occasions. In his Leipzig period part of Bach's secular cantata production is no longer in the Serenata format, but rather dramma per musica, implying a dramatic plot beyond mythological figures congratulating or paying homage to the person in whose honour the cantata was written.

Numerical and alphabetical
The BWV numbers assigned to the secular cantatas are random with regard to chronology and occasion. In the Bach Compendium (BC), the secular cantatas are part of series G. That series also includes two cantatas known from very scant sources (Nos. 49 and 52), insufficient to determine whether they were intended as sacred or secular.

By text incipit

Most of the secular cantatas are named after the first words of the libretto (incipit):
 Amore traditore, BWV 203 (1720?)
 Angenehmes Wiederau, BWV 30a (28 September 1737, text probably by Picander)
 Auf, schmetternde Töne der muntern Trompeten, BWV 207a (3 August 1735)
 Auf, süß-entzückende Gewalt, BWV Anh. 196 (27 November 1725, music lost, text by C. Gottsched)
 Blast Lärmen, ihr Feinde, BWV 205a (19 February 1734)
 Der Himmel dacht auf Anhalts Ruhm und Glück, BWV 66a (10 December 1718, music largely lost, text by Christian Friedrich Hunold)
 Dich loben die lieblichen Strahlen der Sonne, BWV Anh. 6 (1 January 1720, music lost, text by Christian Friedrich Hunold)
 Die Freude reget sich, BWV 36b (27 July 1735, music partially lost, text possibly by Picander)
 Die Zeit, die Tag und Jahre macht, BWV 134a (1 January 1719, music reconstructed after BWV 134, text by Christian Friedrich Hunold)
 Durchlauchtster Leopold, BWV 173a (10 December 1722?)
 Entfernet euch, ihr heitern Sterne, BWV Anh. 9 (12 May 1727, music lost, text by Christian Friedrich Haupt)
 Entfliehet, verschwindet, entweichet, ihr Sorgen, BWV 249a (23 February 1725, music partially lost)
 Erwählte Pleißenstadt, BWV 216a (1728–1731, music partially reconstructable based on BWV 216, text by C. G. Meißner?)
 Es lebe der König, der Vater im Lande, BWV Anh. 11 (3 August 1732, music lost, text by Picander)
 Froher Tag, verlangte Stunden, BWV Anh. 18 (5 June 1732, music lost, text by Johann Heinrich Winckler)
 Frohes Volk, vergnügte Sachsen, BWV Anh. 12 (3 August 1733, music lost, text by Picander)
 Geschwinde, ihr wirbelnden Winde, BWV 201 (1729, text by Picander)
 Heut ist gewiss ein guter Tag, BWV Anh. 7 (10 December 1720, music lost, text by Christian Friedrich Hunold)
 Ich bin in mir vergnügt, BWV 204 (1726–1727, text by Christian Friedrich Hunold)
 Ihr Häuser des Himmels, ihr scheinenden Lichter, BWV 193a (3 August 1727, music lost, text by Picander)
 Laß, Fürstin, laß noch einen Strahl, BWV 198 (17 October 1727, text by Johann Christoph Gottsched)
 Laßt uns sorgen, laßt uns wachen, BWV 213 (5 September 1733, text by Picander)
 Mer hahn en neue Oberkeet, BWV 212 (30 August 1742, text by Picander)
 Murmelt nur, ihr heitern Bäche, BWV Anh. 195 (9 June 1723, music lost, text published in 1723)
 Non sa che sia dolore, BWV 209 (1747?)
 O angenehme Melodei, BWV 210a (12 January 1729, fragment)
 O holder Tag, erwünschte Zeit, BWV 210 (19 September 1741)
 Preise dein Glücke, gesegnetes Sachsen, BWV 215 (5 October 1734, text by Johann Christoph Clauder)
 Schleicht, spielende Wellen, BWV 206 (two versions: 7 October 1736, or 1734, and 3 August 1740)
 Schweigt stille, plaudert nicht, BWV 211 (1734, text by Picander)
 Schwingt freudig euch empor, BWV 36c (1725?)
 So kämpfet nur, ihr muntern Töne, BWV Anh. 10 (25 August 1731, music largely lost, text by Picander)
 Steigt freudig in die Luft, BWV 36a (30 November 1726?, music largely lost, text by Picander)
 Thomana saß annoch betrübt, BWV Anh. 19 (21 November 1734, music lost, text probably by )
 Tönet, ihr Pauken! Erschallet, Trompeten! BWV 214 (8 December 1733, text by Picander)
 Vereinigte Zwietracht der wechselnden Saiten, BWV 207 (11 December 1726)
 Vergnügte Pleißenstadt, BWV 216 (5 February 1728, incomplete, text by Picander)
 Verjaget, zerstreuet, zerrüttet, ihr Sterne, BWV 249b (25 August 1726, music lost, text by Picander)
 Was mir behagt, ist nur die muntre Jagd, BWV 208 and 208a (three versions: 23 February 1713, 1715 and 3 August 1742, text by Salomon Franck)
 Weichet nur, betrübte Schatten, BWV 202 (1718?)
 Willkommen! Ihr herrschenden Götter der Erden, BWV Anh. 13 (28 April 1738, music lost, text by Johann Christoph Gottsched)
 Zerreißet, zersprenget, zertrümmert die Gruft, BWV 205 (3 August 1725, text by Picander)

Other titles

 Aeolus Placated, The Placating of Aeolus (Der zufriedengestellte Äolus) → Zerreißet, zersprenget, zertrümmert die Gruft, BWV 205
 Apollo and Mercurius (Apollo et Mercurius) → Erwählte Pleißenstadt, BWV 216a
 Coffee Cantata (Kaffee-Kantate) → Schweigt stille, plaudert nicht, BWV 211
 The Celebration of Genius (Die Feier des Genius) → Verjaget, zerstreuet, zerrüttet, ihr Sterne, BWV 249b
 The Dispute between Phoebus and Pan (Der Streit zwischen Phoebus und Pan); Phoebus and Pan → Geschwinde, ihr wirbelnden Winde, BWV 201
 Flow Gently, Fair Rivers! (Schleicht, spielende Wellen! BWV 206)
 Hercules at the Crossroads (Herkules am Scheidewege); The Choice of Hercules (Die Wahl des Herkules) → Laßt uns sorgen, laßt uns wachen, BWV 213
 Hunting Cantata, also Hunt Cantata (Jagdkantate) → Was mir behagt, ist nur die muntre Jagd, BWV 208–208a
 A Merry Contest of the Gods → Was mir behagt, ist nur die muntre Jagd, BWV 208–208a
 Mourning Ode (Trauer-Ode or Trauerode), also Funeral Ode, Ode of Mourning → Laß, Fürstin, laß noch einen Strahl, BWV 198
 On Contentedness (Von der Vergnügsamkeit) → Ich bin in mir vergnügt, BWV 204
 Peal, Shattering Fanfares! (Auf, schmetternde Töne! BWV 207a)
 Peasant Cantata (Bauern-Kantate), also Burlesque Cantata (Cantate burlesque) → Mer hahn en neue Oberkeet, BWV 212
 Pleasant Fields of Wiederau (Angenehmes Wiederau, BWV 30a)
 Praise thy Good Fortune! (Preise dein Glücke! BWV 215)
 "Sheep may safely graze" ("Schafe können sicher weiden"), 9th movement of the Hunting Cantata → Was mir behagt, ist nur die muntre Jagd, BWV 208
 Shepherds' Cantata (Schäferkantate) → Entfliehet, verschwindet, entweichet, ihr Sorgen, BWV 249a
 Sweet Voices Harmonious (Vereinigte Zwietracht, BWV 207)
 Thunder, ye Drum-Rolls! (Tönet, ihr Pauken! BWV 214)
 We've got a new squire (Mer hahn en neue Oberkeet, BWV 212)

No title extant
 BWV 184a: secular cantata for New Year (1 January 1721, fragment)
 BWV 194a: secular cantata model for BWV 194 (1717–1723?, text and most of the music lost)
 BWV Anh. 8: congratulation cantata for New Year (1 January 1723, lost)
 BWV Anh. 20: Latin ode (9 August 1723, lost: mentioned in contemporary newspapers)
 BWV deest: Serenade (7 October 1739, lost: mentioned in contemporary newspapers)

Chronological and by occasion
The New Bach Edition groups the secular cantatas in the last seven volumes of Series I.

Music for feasts at the courts of Weimar, Weißenfels and Köthen
NBA Volume 35 – Festmusiken für die Fürstenhäuser von Weimar, Weißenfels und Köthen:
Congratulation cantatas included in the volume:
 BWV 208: Was mir behagt ist nur die muntre Jagd (includes BWV 1040)
 BWV 134a: Die Zeit, die Tag und Jahre macht
 BWV 173a: Durchlauchtster Leopold
Music lost, only described:
 BWV 249a: Entfliehet, verschwindet, entweichet, ihr Sorgen
 BWV 66a: Der Himmel dacht auf Anhalts Ruhm und Glück 
 BWV Anh. 6: Dich loben die lieblichen Strahlen der Sonne
 BWV Anh. 7: Heut ist gewiß ein guter Tag
 BWV Anh. 8: congratulation cantata for New Year 1723
 BWV 184a: congratulation cantata?
 BWV 194a: congratulation cantata?
 BWV 36a: Steigt freudig in die Luft

Music celebrating the Saxonian prince-electoral family
NBA Volume 36 – Festmusiken für das Kurfürstlich-Sächsische Haus I:
Congratulation cantatas included in the volume:
 BWV 213: Lasst uns sorgen, uns wachen
 BWV 214: Tönet, ihr Pauken! Erschallet, Trompeten
 BWV 206: Schleicht, spielende Wellen, und murmelt gelinde
Music lost, only described:
 BWV Anh. 9: Entfernet euch, ihr heitern Sterne
 BWV 193a: Ihr Häuser des Himmels, ihr scheinenden Lichter
 BWV Anh. 11: Es lebe der König, der Vater im Lande
 BWV Anh. 12: Frohes Volk, vergnügte Sachsen

NBA Volume 37 – Festmusiken für das Kurfürstlich-Sächsische Haus II:
Cantatas included in the volume:
 BWV 207a: Auf, schmetternde Töne der muntern Trompeten (includes an appended march)
 BWV 215: Preise dein Glücke, gesegnetes Sachsen
Only described:
 BWV 205a: Blast Lärmen, ihr Feinde! Verstärket die Macht
 BWV 208a: Was mir behagt, ist nur die muntre Jagd
 BWV Anh. 13: Willkommen, ihr herrschenden Götter der Erden

Music for celebrations at the Leipzig University
NBA Volume 38 – Festmusiken zu Leipziger Universitätsfeiern:
Cantatas included in the volume:
 BWV 205: Zerreißet, zersprenget, zertrümmert die Gruft
 BWV 207: Vereinigte Zwietracht der wechselnden Saiten (includes an appended march)
 BWV 198: Lass, Fürstin, lass noch einen Strahl
 BWV 36b: Die Freude reget sich
Only described:
 BWV Anh. 20: Lateinische Ode

For Leipzig's city council and school; Celebrations of noblemen and civilians
NBA Volume 39 – Festmusiken für Leipziger Rats- und Schulfeiern / Huldigungsmusiken für Adelige und Bürger:
Cantatas included in the volume:
 BWV 36c: Schwingt freudig euch empor
 BWV 30a: Angenehmes Wiederau, freue dich in deinen Auen
 BWV 210a: O angenehme Melodei (incomplete)
 BWV 212: Mer hahn en neue Oberkeet
Only described:
 BWV 216a: Erwählte Pleißenstadt
 BWV Anh. 18: Froher Tag, verlangte Stunden
 BWV Anh. 19: Thomana saß annoch betrübt

For weddings and diverse occasions
NBA Volume 40 – Hochzeitskantaten und Weltliche Kantaten verschiedener Bestimmung:
Cantatas included in the volume:
 BWV 202: Weichet nur, betrübte Schatten (wedding)
 BWV 216: Vergnügte Pleißenstadt (wedding, incomplete)
 BWV 210: O holder Tag, erwünschte Zeit (wedding)
 BWV 204: Ich bin in mir vergnügt
 BWV 201: Geschwinde, ihr wirbelnden Winde
 BWV 211: Schweigt stille, plaudert nicht
Music lost, only described:
 BWV Anh. 196: Auf, süß-entzückende Gewalt

Italian cantatas
NBA Volume 41, Varia: Kantaten, Quodlibet, Einzelsätze, Bearbeitungen, contains, apart from various pieces of sacred vocal music and the incomplete Quodlibet, Bach's two Italian cantatas:
 BWV 203: Amore traditore
 BWV 209: Non sa che sia dolore

Extant versions, reconstructions and recordings
Complete recordings of the secular cantatas include those by Peter Schreier and Helmuth Rilling. Also Masaaki Suzuki devoted a series of recordings to the secular cantatas.

References

Sources
 Jones, Richard D. P. "Introduction" to Part I: The Cöthen and early Leipzig years, in 
 Terry, Charles Sanford (1933). "X. The Secular Cantatas" pp. 97–104 in The Music of Bach: An Introduction. London: Oxford University Press

External links
 List of Bach's secular cantatas at classical.net
 "Bach's Secular Cantata Texts" by Ian F. Finlay in Music & Letters Vol. 31, No. 3 (Jul., 1950), pp. 189-195 at JSTOR

 
Lists of compositions by Johann Sebastian Bach